The Palme family is a prominent Swedish family. A family with many members who have evolved into successful persons, the family includes one Swedish prime minister. The most notable member of the Palme family is Olof Palme who served two terms as Prime Minister of Sweden from 1969 to 1976 and from 1982 until his assassination in 1986.

The Palme family is derived from a skipper, the Dutch Palme Lyder, who settled in Ystad, Sweden in the 1600s. The family is related to several other prominent Swedish families such as the von Sydow family, the Wallenberg family, the Kreuger family and the Lagercrantz family.

Relations
This list contains only one branch of the Palme family:
Sven Palme (1854-1934), politician, businessman
Hanna Palme (1861-1959), wife of Sven, daughter of Johan August von Born and Hedvig Lovisa Fransiska von Haartman
Olof Palme (1884-1918), historian, oldest son of Sven
Ola Tenow (1888-1982), wife of Olof Palme
Sven Ulric Palme (1912-1977), historian and university professor, eldest son of Olof and Ola
Barbro von Vegesack (1912-1998), wife of Sven Ulric
Jacob Palme (1941-), university professor and author, eldest son of Sven Ulric and Barbro
Thomas Palme (1944-), ambassador, son of Sven Ulric and Barbro
Christian Palme (1952-), journalist, youngest son of Sven Ulric and Barbro
Rutger Palme (1910-1995), politician, youngest son of Olof and Ola
Gunnar Palme (1886-1934), businessman, son of Sven
Elisabeth von Knieriem (1890-1972), wife of Gunnar, daughter of Woldemar von Knieriem och Elli Kupfer
Claës Palme (1917-2006), lawyer, eldest son of Gunnar and Elisabeth
Catharina Palme Nilzén (1920-2002), wife of physician Åke Nilzén, daughter of Gunnar and Elisabeth
Olof Palme (1927-1986), Prime Minister of Sweden 1969-1976 and 1982-1986, leader of the Social Democrats 1969-1986, youngest son of Gunnar and Elisabeth
Lisbet Palme (1931-2018), wife of Olof and psychologist, daughter of Christian Beck-Friis och Anna-Lisa Bolling
Joakim Palme (1958-), sociologist and university professor, eldest son of Olof and Lisbet
Ann-Sofie Östling (1958-), wife of Joakim
Joanna Östling Palme (1985-), daughter of Joakim
Jan-Erik Kylänpää (1986-), husband of Joanna
Arvid Eugene Palme (2019-) son of Joanna
David Östling Palme (1988-), son of Joakim
Clara Östling Palme (1990-), daughter of Joakim
Mårten Palme (1961-), university professor and economist, son of Olof and Lisbet
Maria Palme (1962-), former wife of Mårten
Cecilia Palme (1991-), daughter of Mårten
Johan Hallerth (1990-), husband of Cecilia
Kristin Palme (1994-), daughter of Mårten
Henrik Palme (1999-), son of Mårten
Johanna Adami (1969-), current wife of Mårten
Arthur Palme Adami (2012-), son of Mårten
Mattias Järvinen Palme (1968-), architect, youngest son of Olof and Lisbet
Åsa Fosshaug Palme (1967-), former wife of Mattias
Karin Palme (1998-), daughter of Mattias
Hedvig Palme (2002-), daughter of Mattias
Linnea Palme (1970-), former wife of Mattias
Axel Palme (2010-), son of Mattias
Anna Järvinen Palme (1970-), current wife of Mattias
Christoffer Gunnrup (1981-), former husband of Anna
Siri Gunnrup Järvinen (2002), daugheter of Anna
Harriet Gunnrup Järvinen (2006), daughter of Anna
Nils Palme (1895-1963), military officer, youngest son of Sven
Margareta Palme (1897-1975), wife of Nils

References
This article is mainly based on Swedish Wikipedia. See the Palme family on Swedish Wikipedia.

External links
 The Palme family

 
Swedish families
Families of Dutch ancestry